Victoria One is a residential skyscraper in Melbourne, Victoria, Australia.

Designed by Elenberg Fraser, the building was first proposed in 2013 and approved by then-Planning Minister Matthew Guy in June 2014. The development reaches 246.8 metres in height – making it the second tallest residential building in the Melbourne CBD core, and the eighth-tallest building in Melbourne overall. The building includes 644 residential apartments spanning across 76 levels.

Construction on the $350 million project commenced in November 2014 and it was completed in mid–2018.

See also

 List of tallest buildings in Melbourne
 Nearby features
 Light House Melbourne
 Queen Victoria Market
 Vision Apartments

References

External links
 

Skyscrapers in Melbourne
Buildings and structures completed in 2018
Residential skyscrapers in Australia
Apartment buildings in Melbourne
2018 establishments in Australia
Elizabeth Street, Melbourne
Buildings and structures in Melbourne City Centre